Marma al-Hajar, alternatively referred to as Dhashtan, is a village in northern Aleppo Governorate, northern Syria.

With 1,818 inhabitants, as per the 2004 census, Marma al-Hajar administratively belongs to Nahiya Jarabulus within Jarabulus District. Nearby localities include al-Jamel  to the southeast, and Jarabulus Tahtani  to the northeast.

References

Aleppo Governorate